Christopher D. M. Fletcher (born March 13, 1958) is a British pathologist who has written more than 500 peer reviewed articles and was a chairman of the World Health Organization's Working Group on the Pathology and Genetics of Tumours of Soft Tissue and Bone. He graduated from London's St. Thomas's Hospital Medical School and got his M.D. degree from the University of London in 1991. Later on, he became a postdoc at the Royal College of Pathologists, from which he also graduated in 1988. He was trained at St Thomas' Hospital and was president of the Association of Directors of Anatomic and Surgical Pathology from 2003 to 2006. Currently he is a Professor of Pathology at Harvard Medical School, president of both the Arthur Purdy Stout Society and the International Society of Bone & Soft Tissue Pathology and is also a surgical pathologist at the Brigham and Women's Hospital. He also works for the Dana–Farber Cancer Institute in Boston, Massachusetts as chief of onco-pathology.

Professor Fletcher is the recipient of a number of awards:
Oswald Van Der Veken Prize (European Community prize for research into musculoskeletal tumors - 1990) 
Young Investigator Award, United States-Canadian Academy of Pathology (1997) 
Henry L. Jaffe Award, Hospital for Joint Diseases, New York (1998) 
Honorary Fellow, College of American Pathologists (2003) 
Fred W. Stewart Medal, Memorial Sloan Kettering Cancer Center (2005) 
Maude Abbott Lecturer, United States-Canadian Academy of Pathology (2008)
Distinguished Pathologist Award, United States-Canadian Academy of Pathology (2017)
The F.K. Mostofi Distinguished Service Award (2020)

References

Living people
20th-century births
British pathologists
Year of birth missing (living people)
Alumni of the University of London